Chinese Pakistani or Pakistani Chinese may refer to:
China–Pakistan relations (c.f. "a Chinese-Pakistani treaty")
Chinese people in Pakistan
Uyghurs in Pakistan
Pakistanis in China
Pakistanis in Hong Kong
Pakistani Chinese cuisine, a style of Chinese cuisine developed by Chinese migrants to Pakistan